A vaccine-associated sarcoma (VAS) or feline injection-site sarcoma (FISS) is a type of malignant tumor found in cats (and, often, dogs and ferrets) which has been linked to certain vaccines.  VAS has become a concern for veterinarians and cat owners alike and has resulted in changes in recommended vaccine protocols.  These sarcomas have been most commonly associated with rabies and feline leukemia virus vaccines, but other vaccines and injected medications have also been implicated.

History
VAS was first recognized at the University of Pennsylvania School of Veterinary Medicine in 1991.  An association between highly aggressive fibrosarcomas and typical vaccine location (between the shoulder blades) was made.  Two possible factors for the increase of VAS at this time were the introduction in 1985 of vaccines for rabies and feline leukemia virus (FeLV) that contained aluminum adjuvant, and a law in 1987 requiring rabies vaccination in cats in Pennsylvania.  In 1993, a causal relationship between VAS and administration of aluminium adjuvanted rabies and FeLV vaccines was established through epidemiologic methods, and in 1996 the Vaccine-Associated Feline Sarcoma Task Force was formed to address the problem.

In 2003, a study of ferret fibrosarcoma indicated that this species also may develop VAS.  Several of the tumors were located in common injection sites and had similar histologic features to VAS in cats.  Also in 2003, a study in Italy compared fibrosarcoma in dogs from injection sites and non-injection sites to VAS in cats, and found distinct similarities between the injection site tumors in dogs and VAS in cats.  This suggests that VAS may occur in dogs.

Pathology
Inflammation in the subcutis following vaccination is considered to be a risk factor in the development of VAS, and vaccines containing aluminum were found to produce more inflammation.  Furthermore, particles of aluminum adjuvant have been discovered in tumor macrophages. In addition, individual genetic characteristics can also contribute to these injection-site sarcomas.  The incidence of VAS is between 1 in 1,000 to 1 in 10,000 vaccinated cats and has been found to be dose-dependent.  The time from vaccination to tumor formation varies from three months to eleven years.  Fibrosarcoma is the most common VAS; other types include rhabdomyosarcoma, myxosarcoma, chondrosarcoma, malignant fibrous histiocytoma, and undifferentiated sarcoma.

Similar examples of sarcomas developing secondary to inflammation include tumors associated with metallic implants and foreign body material in humans, and sarcomas of the esophagus associated with Spirocerca lupi infection in dogs and ocular sarcomas in cats following trauma.  Cats may be the predominant species to develop VAS because they have an increased susceptibility to oxidative injury, as evidenced also by an increased risk of Heinz body anemia and acetaminophen toxicity.

Diagnosis
VAS appears as a rapidly growing firm mass in and under the skin.  The mass is often quite large when first detected and can become ulcerated or infected.  It often contains fluid-filled cavities, probably because of its rapid growth.  Diagnosis of VAS is through a biopsy.  The biopsy will show the presence of a sarcoma, but information like location and the presence of inflammation or necrosis will increase the suspicion of VAS.  It is possible for cats to have a granuloma form after vaccination, so it is important to differentiate between the two before radical surgery is performed.  One guideline for biopsy is if a growth is present three months after surgery, if a growth is greater than two centimeters, or if a growth is becoming larger one month after vaccination.

X-rays are taken prior to surgery because about one in five cases of VAS will develop metastasis, usually to the lungs but possibly to the lymph nodes or skin.

Treatment
Treatment of VAS is through aggressive surgery.  As soon as the tumor is recognized, it should be removed with very wide margins to ensure complete removal.  Treatment may also include chemotherapy or radiation therapy.  The most significant prognostic factor is initial surgical treatment.  One study showed that cats with radical (extensive) initial surgery had a median time to recurrence of 325 days versus 79 days for cats with marginal initial excision.  The expression of a mutated form of p53, a tumor suppressor gene, is found commonly in VAS and indicates a poorer prognosis.

Precautionary measures
New vaccine protocols have been put forth by the American Association of Feline Practitioners that limit type and frequency of vaccinations given to cats.  Specifically, the vaccine for feline leukemia virus should only be given to kittens and high risk cats. Feline rhinotracheitis/panleukopenia/calicivirus vaccines should be given as kittens, a year later and then every three years.  Also, vaccines should be given in areas making removal of VAS easier, namely: as close as possible to the tip of the right rear paw for rabies, the tip of the left rear paw for feline leukemia (unless combined with rabies), and on the right shoulder—being careful to avoid the midline or interscapular space—for other vaccines (such as FVRCP).  There have been no specific associations between development of VAS and vaccine brand or manufacturer, concurrent infections, history of trauma, or environment.

See also
 Vaccine injury

References

External links
 Vaccine-Associated Feline Sarcoma Task Force (VAFSTF)
 Vaccines and Sarcomas Informational Brochure from the Cornell Feline Health Center
 "Vaccine-Associated Fibrosarcoma in Cats" from Pet Cancer Center
 2006 Feline Vaccination Guidelines (Summary)
 Cat Vaccines Can Lead to Cancer

Cat diseases
Sarcoma
Vaccine-associated sarcoma in animals